Sebastián Ernesto Vega (born July 9, 1988) is an Argentine professional basketball player for Gimnasia y Esgrima de Comodoro Rivadavia, in the Liga Nacional de Básquet. At , he plays as a small forward.

He made his debut for Central Entrerriano in 2004, and later spent five years in Quimsa. Vega has played for Gimnasia y Esgrima since 2018. Vega has also played for the national basketball team, representing Argentina in the 2010 South American Basketball Championship.

Professional career
Vega's debut was in 2004, for the local Central Entrerriano club in Gualeguaychú, Entre Ríos. He would later play for Peñarol de Mar del Plata from 2008 to 2010, and for Boca Juniors from 2010 to 2011. In 2011 he signed up for Quimsa, where he played until 2016. After a season in Libertad de Sunchales, he returned to Quimsa in 2017. In 2018, he began playing for Gimnasia y Esgrima de Comodoro Rivadavia.

National team career
Vega formed part of the Argentina men's basketball team at the 2005 South American Youth Championship, the 2006 American Youth Championship, and the 2007 U19 World Championship. In addition, he competed in the 2010 South American Championship in Neiva, Colombia.

Personal life
Vega's sister, Gisela Vega, is also a professional basketball player currently playing for Quimsa. He is nicknamed "Monoco".

In 2020, Vega came out as gay through a post on his Twitter account, becoming the first professional basketball player in Argentina to do so. In 2022, during a game against Quimsa in Santiago del Estero, Vega was subject to homophobic slurs coming from the audience. The game was momentarily stopped and Quimsa was sanctioned by the LNB.

In 2017, he graduated with a technician's degree on labour relations from Universidad Siglo XXI.

References

External links

FIBA Archive Profile
Latinbasket.com Profile
BásquetPlus Profile

1988 births
Living people
Argentine men's basketball players
Small forwards
Boca Juniors basketball players
Gimnasia y Esgrima de Comodoro Rivadavia basketball players
Libertad de Sunchales basketball players
Peñarol de Mar del Plata basketball players
Quimsa basketball players
Sportspeople from Entre Ríos Province
Gay sportsmen
Argentine gay men
LGBT basketball players
Argentine LGBT sportspeople
21st-century Argentine LGBT people